The Bialbero di Casorzo (Italian: "double tree of Casorzo") is situated between Grana and Casorzo in Piedmont, Italy. It is a mulberry tree on which a cherry tree grows. The cherry tree rises well above the mulberry tree on which it stands.

Epiphytical growing trees are not unusual, but they normally reach a small size and have a short lifespan, as there is normally not enough humus and space available where they grow.

Large epiphytes like this one require that the "upper tree" have a root connection to the ground, for example by growing down through a hollow trunk.

See also
 List of individual trees

References 
 

Epiphytes
Individual trees in Italy
Piedmont